Esha Gupta (born 28 November 1985) is an Indian actress, model and the winner of the Miss India International title of 2007. She has established a career in Bollywood films.

Esha Gupta entered the Femina Miss India contest in 2007, where she placed third and won the Miss India International title, and later represented India at Miss International pageant. She soon received offers for film roles, and made her acting debut in the 2012 commercially successful crime thriller Jannat 2, that fetched her a nomination for the Filmfare Award for Best Female Debut. Gupta received praise for her portrayal in the political drama Chakravyuh (2012) but her performance in the comedy film Humshakals (2014) met with negative reviews. Her highest-grossing releases came with the horror thriller Raaz 3D (2013), the crime drama Rustom (2016) and  Baadshaho

Early life
Esha Gupta was born in New Delhi. Her father is a retired Air Force Officer and her mother is a homemaker. She has a sister named Neha. She spent most of her childhood in Dehradun, Hyderabad and Delhi. She has completed Mass Communication from School of Communication, Manipal University, Manipal  Later she pursued a career in Bollywood instead.

Career
Gupta participated in Femina Miss India in 2007, where she won Miss Photogenic and came 3rd to go on to compete in Miss India International. She featured in the Kingfisher Calendar in 2010.

Gupta made her Bollywood debut with Mahesh Bhatt's Jannat 2 in 2012 opposite Emraan Hashmi in the lead role.
 For her debut performance, Taran Adarsh of Bollywood Hungama said, "Debutante Esha Gupta enchants you with her captivating charm. She appears a tad unrefined at places, nonetheless she handles her part assertively." Martin D'Souza of Glam Sham wrote, "As for the debutante, Esha Gupta, I guess she may have to enroll herself into an acting school." Gaurav Malani stated, "Esha Gupta, who looks a mix between Lara Dutta and Isha Koppikar, is merely there for the glam quotient." Asha Mahadevan of Bollywoodlife said, "Even Esha Gupta manages to cry somewhat convincingly but then there is hardly anything for her to do. Her role is limited to looking sexy and she does it well." The film was a success at the box office, earning  domestically and thus brought in more recognition for Gupta. Later, Gupta signed Vikram Bhatt's Raaz 3D alongside her Jannat 2 co-star, Emraan Hashmi and Bipasha Basu, Gupta received mixed reviews from critics for her acting prowess,  film critic Komal Nahta noted, "Esha Gupta is stiff as Sanjana but does much better towards the end (when she almost goes berserk)". India Today wrote, "Both Bipasha and Esha get liberal scope to show off booty. A Bhatt film where the heroines don't get to flaunt it is unimaginable, after all, Bipasha looks hot in her starring role but Esha reveals a few raw edges". Raaz 3D performed well at box office within first three days of its release with collections in the vicinity of 360 million. Her third film of the year, Chakravyuh, was invited to premiere at London Film Fest 

In 2013, Esha acted a cameo in the film Gori Tere Pyaar Mein. In 2014, she was seen in Sajid Khan's Comic Caper Humshakals alongside Saif Ali Khan, Riteish Deshmukh, Ram Kapoor, Bipasha Basu and Tamannaah. Box Office India declared it a "disaster".

In 2017, she played the main antagonist in action film Commando 2, which was a moderate box-office success. In 2019, she played a supporting character in comedy film Total Dhamaal. The film grossed ₹200 crore (US$28 million) worldwide in twelve days of release, and was one of the highest grossing Bollywood films of 2019.

Humanitarian work
Esha is seen participating in environmental initiatives including “Beach Cleanup Drives”, “Walk for saving the Mangroves”, protecting the forests. She is also associated with Surman Sansthan towards girl child upliftment and education.

Personal Life

Gupta is dating Manuel Campos Guallar. She is a vegan.

Filmography

Television

Web series

Songs

Awards and nominations

References

External links

 

Living people
1985 births
21st-century Indian actresses
Actresses from New Delhi
Female models from Delhi
Indian film actresses
Indian television actresses
Indian web series actresses
Actresses in Hindi cinema
Actresses in Telugu cinema
Actresses in Tamil cinema
Actresses in Hindi television
Indian beauty pageant winners
Miss International 2007 delegates
Manipal Academy of Higher Education alumni